Ministry may refer to:

Government 
 Ministry (collective executive), the complete body of government ministers under the leadership of a prime minister
 Ministry (government department), a department of a government

Religion 
 Christian ministry, activity by Christians to spread or express their faith
 Minister (Christianity), clergy authorized by a church or religious organization to perform teaching or rituals
 Ordination, the process by which individuals become clergy
 Ministry of Jesus, activities described in the Christian gospels
 Ministry (magazine), a magazine for pastors published by the Seventh-day Adventist Church

Music 
 Ministry (band), an American industrial metal band
 Ministry of Sound, a London nightclub and record label

Fiction 
 Ministry of Magic, governing body in the Harry Potter series
 Ministry of Darkness, a professional wrestling stable led by The Undertaker

See also
 Minister (disambiguation)
 Department (disambiguation)
 Public Ministry (disambiguation)